Quincampoix is a commune in the Seine-Maritime department in the Normandy region in north-western France.

Geography

Heraldry

Population

Places of interest
 The church of St. Marguerite, dating from the nineteenth century.
 A sixteenth-century stone cross in the cemetery.

People
 It is the burial place of Jacques Anquetil (1934–1987) a road racing cyclist.

See also
Communes of the Seine-Maritime department

References

External links

Official website of Quincampoix 

Communes of Seine-Maritime